David Alan Dickey (born c. 1945) is an American statistician who has specialised in time series analysis. He is a William Neal Reynolds Professor in the Department of Statistics at North Carolina State University. The Dickey–Fuller test is named for him and Wayne Arthur Fuller.
David Dickey is listed as an ISI highly cited researcher by the ISI Highly Cited Database of the ISI Web of Knowledge. He is an elected Fellow (2000) of the  American Statistical Association. He is from Ohio.

Selected works

References

External links
 
 Home page at North Carolina State University

1940s births
Living people
Academics from Ohio
Miami University alumni
Iowa State University alumni
North Carolina State University faculty
American statisticians
Time series econometricians
Fellows of the American Statistical Association